Erik Pärsson (born 10 May 1994) is a Swedish football striker who plays for Landskrona.

Club career
Besides Sweden, he has played in Greece.

On 14 January 2021, Pärsson returned to Landskrona on two-year contract.

References

1994 births
Living people
Swedish footballers
Association football forwards
Lunds BK players
Landskrona BoIS players
Falkenbergs FF players
OFI Crete F.C. players
Mjällby AIF players
Ettan Fotboll players
Superettan players
Super League Greece players
Swedish expatriate footballers
Expatriate footballers in Greece
Swedish expatriate sportspeople in Greece